Darcy L. DeMoss (born August 19, 1963) is an American film and television actress whose credits include Friday the 13th Part VI: Jason Lives, Eden, Erotic Confessions, Pale Blood, Stickfighter and Vice Academy 3. She played Patty in Can't Buy Me Love.

She also appeared in several Ron Harris aerobics productions during the late 1970s and early 1980s. These short productions were seen on HBO, Showtime, and NBC late-night.

Filmography

Film

Television

References

External links

1963 births
Living people
American film actresses
American television actresses
Actresses from Los Angeles
21st-century American women